The Diaries of Vaslav Nijinsky is a 2001 Australian film written, shot, directed and edited by Paul Cox about Vaslav Nijinsky, based on the premier danseur's published diaries.

Cox had the idea of making a film about Nijinsky for over 30 years ever since he heard Paul Scofield read extracts from Nijinksky's diaries on the radio. He used voiceover readings by Derek Jacobi combined with images related to the dancer's life. Several dancers from Leigh Warren & Dancers portrayed Nijinsky in different roles.

Reception

References

External links
The Diaries of Vaslav Nijinsky at Australian Screen Online

Film page at Oz Movies

2001 films
Australian biographical films
Films directed by Paul Cox
Biographical films about entertainers
2000s English-language films
2000s Australian films